Internationalist may refer to:

 Internationalism (politics), a movement to increase cooperation across national borders
 Liberal internationalism, a doctrine in international relations
 Internationalist/Defencist Schism, socialists opposed to World War I
 A member of the:
First International, or International Workingmen's Association, (1864–1876), an organization aimed at uniting various left-wing groups
Second International, (1889–1916), the original Socialist International
International Brigades, volunteers from different countries, who fought for the Second Spanish Republic in the Spanish Civil War (1936–1939)
League for the Fourth International, a Trotskyist international organisation whose most noteworthy section is the Internationalist Group in the United States
 Internationalist Review, an e-journal founded in Maastricht
 The Internationalist, a magazine based in Seattle
 Internationalist (album), a 1998 album by Australian band Powderfinger
 New Internationalist, an international magazine that works for social justice

See also
 Internationalism (disambiguation)